Novobaishevo (Yañı Bayış) is a rural locality (a selo) in Verkhnelachentausky Selsoviet, Birsky District, Bashkortostan, Russia. The population was 76 as of 2010. There are 2 streets.

Geography 
Novobaishevo is located 40 km northwest of Birsk (the district's administrative centre) by road. Nizhnelachentau is the nearest rural locality.

References 

Rural localities in Birsky District